The Andhra Mahila Sabha School Of Informatics is a school of informatics for women located in Hyderabad in the state of Telangana in India. It is an institutional member of the Computer Society of India (CSI). The CSI-AMSSOI Student Branch was established in  2003 bearing the code 147, under the guidance of DVR Vithal, Fellow CSI and Shaukat A Mirza, Former Director of AMSSOI.

Introduction 
The CSI AMSSOI Student Branch was inaugurated by Sh TV Balan, Former CSI President on 5 January 2004. The School has 180 CSI Student members and 3 members of the faculty are Institutional members.

The Student Branch achieved the Best Southern Region Student Branch award in the year 2004 for its active participation. AMSSOI conducts its annual IT meet exclusively for Women ITians of MCA, Adhyayan. Adhyayan 2006 was conducted in association with its student branch. Adhyayan 2007 is proposed to be conducted as National Conference.

Adhyayan 2007 
Adhyayan is an annual technical event of AMSSOI. Students from MCA from all over the state of Andhra Pradesh participate and eminent speakers from educational institutions and industries deliver lectures on topics of current interest. Cash awards are given to students for Paper Contest, Project Contest, Programming Contest, IT quiz and Mock Interviews.

Adhyayan 2006, was conducted on 13 October and 14 October at AMSSOI situated in Durgabai Deshmukh Academic Campus, Osmania University Road, Vidyanagar, Hyderabad. A preconference tutorial was conducted preceding Adhyayan 2006 on 12 October 2006 on "Software Engineering Methodologies and Testing Tools and Soft Skills". 

The tutorial was inaugurated by Prof ML Saikumar. Sh G Krishna Mohan, Associate Manager-Technical Services, Applabs, delivered lecture on "Testing Tools". The Soft Skills session was handled by Sh K Subramanyam from IL&FS. The topic of the lecture was "Lateral Thinking"

This is the sixth consecutive IT meet conducted by AMSSOI and 1st IT Meet conducted in association with the CSI AMSSOI Student Branch.

External links
Official website
Computer Society of India

Educational institutions established in 2003
Women's universities and colleges in Telangana
2003 establishments in Andhra Pradesh